CSM Corona Brașov, founded in 2007 as Sport Club Municipal Fenestela 68, is an ice hockey team in Brașov, Romania

They played two Erste Liga finals, in 2014 and 2021, but  " The wolves" as they are called lost both of them. The first one against Nove Zamky (Slovakia) and the last one against Sportklub Csikszereda (Romania).

"The wolves" finished the 2020-2021 season 1st 

As the veteran Arpad Mihaly finished his playing career in Brasov, the organisation decided to retire his number, the number 24

History
The team has registered to play in the Romanian national league in 2008 and in the Erste Liga in 2009.

They won the 2012 Romanian Cup after winning the final against HSC Csíkszereda and were runners-up in the 2010–11 and 2011–12 editions of the Romanian national league and the 2008, 2010 and 2011 editions of the Romanian Cup. In 2013–14, Corona Wolves Brasov won the Romanian National League and run up in the 2014 edition of the Continental Cup. Also in the 2013–2014 season they were vice champions of the MOL League after beating DAB Docler (the champion of the 2012–13 edition, from Hungary) in the semifinals and lost against Nove Zamky (Slovakia) in the finals.

In the 2014–15 season, they won once again the Romanian Cup against HSC Csíkszereda and play in the finals of the Romanian National League. Corona Wolves Brașov are qualified in the playoffs of the MOL League of 2014–15 edition.

Achievements
National League:
Winners (3): 2013–14, 2016–17, 2018–19
Runners-up (3): 2010–11, 2011–12, 2012–13
Romanian Cup:
Winners (3): 2012–13, 2014–15, 2020–21
Runners-up (6): 2008–09, 2010–11, 2011–12, 2013–14, 2017–18, 2018–19
Erste Liga:
Runners-up (1): 2013-2014
Continental Cup:
Runners-up (1): 2014

Venue

Corona play on the Olympic Ice Rink in the city. It was inaugurated in January 2010 and can usually host more than 1,500 people in seats; It is located at no. 5 Turnului street, which is 5 minutes walking distance from the railway station and easily accessible by public transportation.

Notes and references

External links
 
Wolves.ro 

Ice hockey teams in Romania
Erste Liga (ice hockey) teams
Sport in Brașov
2007 establishments in Romania
Ice hockey clubs established in 2007